Soňa Pennigerová (born 26 October 1928) is a former Czech politician.

She was appointed Speaker of the Chamber of People of the Federal Assembly in 1969.

References

1928 births
Living people
20th-century Czech women politicians
Government ministers of Czechoslovakia
Place of birth missing (living people)